The Exon-Intron Database (EID) is a database of spliced mRNA sequences.

See also
 Alternative splicing
 Exon
 Intron

References

External links
 Homepage

Biological databases
Gene expression
Spliceosome
RNA splicing